Bayo is a 1985 Canadian drama film, directed by Mort Ransen and written by Ransen, Terry Ryan, and Arnie Gelbart. The film stars Ed McNamara, Patricia Phillips, Stephan McGrath, Hugh Webster, Cedric Smith, Patrick Lane, and Maisie Rillie. Set in Tickle Cove, Newfoundland and Labrador, the film focuses on the relationship of Bayo (McGrath), a young boy living with his single parent Sharon (Phillips). When Sharon's long-estranged father Phillip (McNamara) returns, Bayo's fascination with his grandfather threatens to upend Sharon's plan to move to Toronto.

The film had a limited theatrical run in the spring of 1985, before airing on CBC Television in the fall. McNamara received a Genie Award nomination for Best Actor at the 7th Genie Awards in 1986, while Phillips received an ACTRA Award nomination for Best Television Actress the same year.

Plot 
Sharon (Patricia Phillips) and her ten-year old son Bayo (Stephen McGrath) reside in the small settlement of Tickle Cove, located on the shores of Bonavista Bay, Newfoundland. Their family has lived there for multiple generations. But, Sharon despises her small-town life that she has there. It is Sharon's dream to move to Toronto so she can forge a new start, which would provide her and Bayo with a better life. Sharon is inspired to move to Toronto because it was where her deceased mother was born. She leaves her large suitcase trunk that is full of clothes in the centre of the foyer in her house. This is a symbolic gesture signalling that the move will soon become a reality.

Sharon hates her father, Phillip Longlan (Ed McNamara), as much as living in Tickle Cove because he forced her and her mother to live there. Phillip subjected them to a life there so he could pursue his passion. Phillip is a fisherman who spends most of his time on a commercial fishing vessel. He supports Sharon by providing her with enough money to survive, but not enough that would allow her to follow through on her dream of leaving.

Bayo does not want to leave, especially since he would leave his grandfather behind. Bayo loves the sea and wants to spend his entire life by the water. Bayo never met his father, who lived and died by the sea. Phillip tells Bayo various stories about sailing, which gives Bayo the fantasy of rowing across the Atlantic Ocean to Portugal.

When Phillip visits Bayo and Sharon, Bayo begs his grandfather not to give his mother enough money that would provide them with the opportunity to move to Toronto. As Phillip grows older he ponders his immediate future and the implications of Bayo learning more about his father.

Cast 

 Ed McNamara as Phillip Longlan
 Patricia Phillips as Sharon
 Stephen McGrath as Bayo
 Hugh Webster as Wilf Taylor
 Cedric Smith as Squid Hayman
 Patrick Lane as Old Hayman
 Maisie Rillie as Wanda Hayman
 Nellie Ludlow as Effie Taylor
 Jane Dingle as Mrs. Merrill
 Griffith Brewer as Bern Taylor
 Gordon Ralph as George Walsh
 Richard Edwards as Billy
 Fred Smith as Jimmy White
 Lloyd Olford as Cliff Hunt

Production 
The film was adapted from the novel Lightly by Nova Scotia author Chipman Hall. The sole novel published by Hall, who was otherwise employed as a journalist, Lightly was largely out of print by the time of the film's release, and was later republished by the New Canadian Library series under the Bayo title.

Release 
Bayo had a limited theatrical release on April 25, 1985 in Newfoundland. It was released at the Avalon Mall in St. John's, Gander, and Corner Brook. It was also released to a wider audience on television through the CBC. Sixtmonths later, the film was released during the fall of 1985.

Streaming
In Jan 2020 the film was released online on the Canada Media Fund’s Encore+ YouTube channel.

Critical response 
The film has received positive reviews from critics. In Jan Teag's positive review for Cinema Canada, he called Bayo a special film. Noting that Ransen "shied away from the Hollywood gloss that would have destroyed it and has achieved an uncommon ability to make the viewer both joyfully and painfully conscious of their own humanity, that element which is the only true universal".

Accolades

References

External links 
 
 

1985 films
Canadian drama films
English-language Canadian films
Films set in Newfoundland and Labrador
Films shot in Newfoundland and Labrador
Films directed by Mort Ransen
Films based on Canadian novels
1985 drama films
1980s English-language films
1980s Canadian films